Christopher Lyddy (born April 8, 1983) is an American politician who served in the Connecticut House of Representatives from the 106th district from 2009 to 2013. He was previously elected to the Town of Newtown's Legislate Council where in his first run for office received the highest number of votes of any council candidate during the 2007 election, surprising veteran politicos in Newtown and throughout the region.

During his tenure in the Connecticut General Assembly, Lyddy championed issues such as the long-term care and treatment of Lyme disease, ensuring doctors and patients had the autonomy to determine the best course of treatment without the threat of prosecution when treating outside of the IDSA guidelines.

Lyddy's husband, Erick Russell, was elected Connecticut State Treasurer in the 2022 elections, becoming the first Black LGBT statewide officeholder in the United States.

References

1983 births
Living people
21st-century American politicians
Democratic Party members of the Connecticut House of Representatives
LGBT state legislators in Connecticut